In the mathematical fields of category theory and abstract algebra, a subquotient is a quotient object of a subobject. Subquotients are particularly important in abelian categories, and in group theory, where they are also known as sections, though this conflicts with a different meaning in category theory.

In the literature about sporadic groups wordings like « is involved in » can be found with the apparent meaning of « is a subquotient of ».

A quotient of a subrepresentation of a representation (of, say, a group) might be called a subquotient representation; e.g., Harish-Chandra's subquotient theorem.

Examples
Of the 26 sporadic groups, the 20 subquotients of the monster group are referred to as the "Happy Family", whereas the remaining 6 as "pariah groups".

Order relation
The relation subquotient of is an order relation.

Proof of transitivity for groups
Then all vertical maps 

with suitable  are surjective for the respective pairs

Relation to cardinal order
In constructive set theory, where the law of excluded middle does not necessarily hold, one can consider the relation subquotient of as replacing the usual order relation(s) on cardinals. This order relation is traditionally denoted 

See also
 Homological algebra
 Subcountable

References

Category theory
Abstract algebra